Campbell Johnston "C. J." McDiarmid (July 29, 1869 – May 13, 1942) was an American attorney who was the principal owner of the Cincinnati Reds of Major League Baseball.

Biography
McDiarmid was born in July 1869 in Barnesville, Ohio, and spent much of his childhood in Ontario. His family then moved to Cincinnati, where he graduated from Woodward High School, the University of Cincinnati, and the University of Cincinnati College of Law. In addition to practicing law, he played semi-professional baseball as a pitcher.

McDiarmid held front-office positions in Major League Baseball, first as a director of the St. Louis Browns of the American League during 1907–1919, then as secretary of the Cincinnati Reds of the National League. During those seasons, the Reds finished in fifth place and seventh place, respectively, in the eight-team National League. Late in the 1929 season, Sidney Weil acquired enough shares to become the controlling owner of the Reds.

McDiarmid died in Wyoming, Ohio, in May 1942; he was survived by his wife, three daughters, and two sons. He is buried in Cincinnati's Spring Grove Cemetery.

References

External links
Cincinnati Reds timeline

1869 births
1942 deaths
People from Barnesville, Ohio
University of Cincinnati alumni
University of Cincinnati College of Law alumni
Ohio lawyers
St. Louis Browns executives
Major League Baseball owners
Cincinnati Reds owners
Burials at Spring Grove Cemetery